Jordan Creek is a stream in southeastern Dade County, Missouri. It is a tributary of Sinking Creek.

The short stream starts just east of Missouri Route M south of Everton flows west and then northwest past Missouri Route K to its confluence with Sinking Creek west of Everton.

Jordan Creek was named after the Jordan River in southwest Asia.

See also
List of rivers of Missouri

References

Rivers of Dade County, Missouri
Rivers of Missouri